Torricelli may refer to:

People with the surname
 Evangelista Torricelli (1608–1647), Italian physicist and mathematician
 Robert Torricelli (born 1951), United States politician
 Moreno Torricelli (born 1970), Italian football player
 Giuseppe Antonio Torricelli (1662–1719), Italian sculptor

Science
 Torricelli's law, a theorem in fluid dynamics
 Torricelli's equation, an equation created by Evangelista Torricelli
 Torricelli's trumpet or Gabriel's Horn, a geometric figure
 Torricelli point or Fermat point, a point such that the total distance from the three vertices of the triangle to the point is the minimum possible
 Torricelli's experiment, an experiment named after Torricelli

Italian submarines
 Evangelista Torricelli, an 
 Torricelli, a 
 , the former USS Lizardfish

Other
 Torricelli (crater), a lunar crater in the Sinus Asperitatis
 Torricelli Act, another part of the United States' long running embargo against Cuba
 Torricelli languages, a language family of Papua New Guinea
 Torricelli Mountains, a mountain range in Papua New Guinea

See also
 Torr or mm Hg, a unit of pressure named after Evangelista Torricelli

Italian-language surnames